is a 1999 Japanese video game for the PlayStation. It was developed by the New Corporation and released only in Japan. It is a 2D platform game.

The game's story focuses on Ralph, a man who has been turned into a child who now must save a damsel in distress. Reviewers praised the game for its high quality graphics, music, and difficulty.

Gameplay 

The Adventure of Little Ralph is a two-dimensional side scrolling action game.

There are several difficulty modes. Selecting easy mode results in the last few levels being skipped, and being unable to view the real ending.

There are a total of eight stages in the game, and they include locations such as a desert, an iceberg, and a flying battleship.

The player can collect fruit to increase points, which will appear as the player moves through stages. Alternate and secret paths net more fruit to collect.

Some stages scroll vertically, and some stages scroll horizontally. The player will use ropes and ledges to climb the vertical stages.

The player can perform a downward strike using their sword. It is a feature common in fantasy games featuring swords.

During boss fights, Ralph grows to adult size, and it turns into a fighting game. Moves are similar to Street Fighter II, and there's a blocking button. Beating the game unlocks a two-player versus mode, where players can play as Ralph or any of the game's bosses.

The game contains eight stages in total. The game has an emphasis on earning points, which had become less popular in gaming at the time.

Plot 

In the game, a demon named Valgo has come to town, transformed an adult swordsman named Ralph into a small child, and kidnapped his girlfriend.

Development
New Corp was formed by out of the arcade game center community in Kashiwazaki, Niigata Japan. They released Boxer’s Road, a boxing game for the PlayStation in 1995.

Development on the game began in 1991. The original platform it was development for was the Sharp X68000 home computer before eventually moving to the PlayStation. Designer Aoyagi Ryuta cites Wonder Boy, Rastan, and Quartet as influences. The motivation of the dev team at the time, was that platformers were already starting to wane, and they took it as a challenge to make a great platforming game.

The music was composed by Hiroki Kuroonuma, Naoki Tsuchiya, and Hideki Sato. The score was made collaboratively, and aimed to evoke sounds from the 80's. Tsuchiya did all of the sound effects himself.

When The Adventure of Little Ralph was released, it was one of the few two-dimensional games released during that time period, and there was far more interest in three-dimensional games. Other two-dimensional games such as Skullmonkeys had sold poorly, and Castlevania: Symphony of the Night had relatively low sales.

Releases
The game was released on June 3, 1999 in Japan only for the Sony PlayStation. It retailed for 4800 yen. To promote the game, a high score contest was held at release. First place won an IMac, second won a Sony MiniDisc radio and cassette player, and third won a MiniDisc walkman. Since its release, physical copies of the game has been known to fetch as high as US$200 on online auction sites such as eBay. In 2014, Eurogamer noted the price could be £80 - £100.

The game was later released on PlayStation Network for the PlayStation 3 and PlayStation Portable in Japan on July 26, 2007 and was published by Ertain Corporation. The soundtrack to the game was released in 2009 by EGG Music.

Reception

Four reviewers for Weekly Famitsu gave the game 26 points out of 40. Reviewers noted the game's difficulty, saying it was suitable for those who wished for an older style video game. One reviewer compared it to Famicom titles.

Gamers' Republic magazine game the game a B−. They noted the minecart section was very similar to the one in Hermie Hopperhead. The reviewer praised the 2D graphics, and challenging gameplay which was a contrast to many modern 3D games. The reviewer noted the only flaw in the game was its short length, but still recommended it to import for fans of 2D side scrolling games. Gamers' Republic later listed the game in their 1999 Video Game Buyers Guide and Y2K Preview as one of the best games to import from Japan that year along with such games as, Bangai-O, Neon Genesis Evangelion, Pepsiman, Robot Dandy, and Internal Section.

Planet PlayStation gave it a score of 75 out of 100.

Spanish magazine Loading praised the game.

See also 
 Magical Pop'n

Notes

References

External links 
 
 The Adventure of Little Ralph at Collavier Corporation
 The Adventure of Little Ralph at GameFAQs
 The Adventure of Little Ralph at MobyGames

1999 video games
Cancelled X68000 games
Japan-exclusive video games
Platform games
Sony Interactive Entertainment games
PlayStation (console) games
PlayStation Network games
Side-scrolling video games
Single-player video games
Video games developed in Japan
Victorian era in popular culture